The Most Illustrious Order of Saint Patrick is a British order of chivalry associated with Ireland. The Order was created in 1783 by George III at the instigation of the Lord Lieutenant of Ireland, The 3rd Earl Temple (1753–1813; created The 1st Marquess of Buckingham in 1784). The regular creation of knights of Saint Patrick lasted until 1921, when most of Ireland became independent as the Irish Free State. While the Order technically still exists, no knight of St Patrick has been created since 1936, and the last surviving knight, Prince Henry, Duke of Gloucester, died in 1974. The King, however, remains the Sovereign of the Order. The position of King of Arms of the order was held by Ulster King of Arms; this office still exists, since 1943 it has been combined with Norroy King of Arms. St Patrick is patron of the order; its motto is Quis separabit?, Latin for "Who will separate us?": an allusion to the Vulgate translation of Romans 8:35, "Who shall separate us from the love of Christ?"

The first appointments were made on 11 March 1783, and consisted of 15 Knight Founders, and in total there have been 145 appointments. The original Royal Warrant (dated 5 February 1783) specified that there were to be no more than fifteen knights of the Order at any one time, something that changed in 1821 when George IV appointed an extra six knights (although the royal warrant was not altered to reflect this change until 1830). William IV appointed an additional four knights at his coronation, and on 24 January 1833 increased the maximum number of knights to 22.

References
General
 

Specific

Further reading
 

Knights of St Patrick

Saint Patrick